Brussels Film Festival, Brussels International Film Festival or Festival International du Film de Bruxelles may refer to:

Brussels International Film Festival (1974–2016), also known as the Brussels European Film Festival, Brussels Film Festival, or BRFF
Brussels International Film Festival (2018–present), abbreviated as BRIFF
Brussels International Fantastic Film Festival, since 1983, featuring horror, thriller and science fiction films
Brussels Independent Film Festival, since 1974, formerly Brussels International Independent Film Festival
Brussels Short Film Festival, since 1998

See also
Offscreen Film Festival, a film festival in Brussels